The China–Korea Champions League is a Go competition.

Outline
This tournament is a team competition. The teams that play are the winners from the Chinese and Korean Weiqi/Baduk Leagues. Each of their players face off against each other and whoever comes out with the most wins is the winner of the tournament.

Past winners & Runners up

International Go competitions